The deepbody boarfish (Antigonia capros) is a species of boarfish, the most widespread species in the family, found at depths of  in the Atlantic, Indian and Pacific Oceans, though it usually is found at depths of . It is of minor importance to commercial fishery operations.

References

Caproidae
Fish described in 1843